The Penang Philharmonic Orchestra (PPO) is an amateur orchestra funded by the state of Penang in Malaysia. The formation of the orchestra aims to build a community that enhances the standard of classical music in Penang. Established in 2010, the PPO performs a wide-ranging of music genre, mainly classical music from various repertoire. Todate, it has a total of 80 musicians and holds regular concerts throughout the year.

This orchestra is under the umbrella of Penang Philharmonic, which is formerly known as Penang State Symphony Orchestra and Chorus, founded in 1996.

Music directors / conductors
 Jascha Yasufumi Shimano (2003–2009) Music Director / Resident conductor (Note: Under Penang State Symphony Orchestra)
 Woon Wen Kin (2010–2012) Music Director / Resident conductor
 Ng Choong Yen (2013–) Resident conductor

Penang Philharmonic Chamber Choir
"Voices of Penang Philharmonic (VOPP)" is the resident chorus for Penang Philharmonic. It was established in 2012

In March 2019, Penang Philharmonic Orchestra has announced that VOPP, which was originally formed for youth choir to be opened to choristers aged between 18 and 40, and later changed its name to Penang Philharmonic Chamber Choir (PPCC)  This rebranding strategy is coherent with Penang Philharmonic's vision to push the resident choir to greater heights. The age restriction has also been removed to recruit the crème de la crème in the local choral scene.

As of 2019, the chorus is led by the artistic directors and choral conductors Lim Ai Hooi and Yong Chee Foon, and assistant conductor, Ong Geok Cheng.

References

External links
 Penang Philharmonic Orchestra official website
 Penang Philharmonic Choir official website
 Penang Philharmonic main site

Malaysian orchestras
Musical groups established in 2010
2010 establishments in Malaysia